Ismaël Lô (also Ismaël Lo; born 1956) is a Senegalese musician and actor.

Life
Lô was born in Dogondoutchi, Niger on 30 August 1956, to a Senegalese father and a Nigerien mother. Shortly after Lo's birth the family returned to Senegal where they settled in the town of Rufisque, near the capital Dakar. He plays guitar and harmonica, and has been called "the Bob Dylan of Africa".

In the 1970s, Lo studied at the School of Art in Dakar. He later joined the popular group Super Diamono, but left in 1984 to start a solo career. Over the next four years Lo recorded five popular solo albums.

In 1988, he composes the soundtrack for Ousmane Sembene's Camp de Thiaroye and plays in it. He would also star in Moussa Sene Absa's film Tableau Ferraille (Iron Landscape), in 1996, and compose more soundtracks.

In 1990, Lo signed a recording deal with Barclay and recorded in France his seventh solo album, Ismael Lo. Thanks to the success of the single "Tajabone" the album became a hit in the European charts. The album launched Lo's international career.

Iso was recorded and released in 1994, and also became a success. The album contains soft guitar melodies and traditional Senegalese mbalax. The following year Lo toured in Africa. The compilation album Jammu Africa was released in 1996. The song "Without Blame" is a duet with Marianne Faithfull.

Lo's song "Tajabone" was featured in Pedro Almodóvar's film All About My Mother.

In 2002, he was made a Knight of the Legion of Honor.

His 2006 album Sénégal was recorded in Dakar, Paris and London. Lo says of it, "Giving this album the title Sénégal was my way of paying tribute to my own country, in recognition of all its gifts to me".

The film Shake Hands with the Devil (2007), about the Rwandan genocide, starts with Lo's song "Jammu Africa".

Discography

Albums
Gor Sayina (1981)
[A] Yaye Boye Balalma / Gor Saay Na / Ale Lo/ Woudje Yaye – [B] Tiedo / N'daxami / Sey / Adou Calpe
Xalat (1984)
[A] Xalat / Tali Be (Talibe) / Lote Lo – [B] Xamul Dara / Mariama / Fa Diallo
Xiif (1986)
[A] Alal / Bode Gor / Xiif (Ethiopie Sahel) – [B] Tiedo / Diouma / Marie Lo
Natt (1986)
[A] Ataya / Natt / Djola Kele – [B] Samag La / Mougneul / Tadieu Bone
Diawar (1988)
[A] Jele Bi/ Sophia / Taar Dousey – [B] Diawar / Jalia / Adou Calpe
Wadiour (1990)
[A] Wadiour / Diabar / Souleymane – [B] Mbarawath / Nene / Tariha
Ismael Lo (1990)
Tajabone / Raciste / Ale Lo / Jiggeny Ndakaru / Fa Diallo / Souleymane / M'barawath / Nene
Iso (1994)
Dibi Dibi Rek / Nafantav / La Femme sans haine / Rero / Senegambie / Baol Baol / Naboou / Nassarane / Wassalia / Setsinala / Khar / Samayaye
Jammu Africa (compilation, 1996)
Jammu Africa / Nafantav / Sofia / Tajabone / Raciste / Nabou / Without Blame / Dibi Dibi Rek / Lotte Lo / Souleymane / Samba Et Leuk / Takou Deneu / Khar
Dabah (2001)
Aiwa / L'amour a tous les droits / Biguisse / Amoul Solo / Dabah / Boulfale / Faut qu'on s'aime / Africa Democratie / Diour Sani / Badara / Ma dame / N'Dally / Xalas / Mam
Sénégal (2 October 2006)
 "Baykat"
 "Incha Allah"
 "Tass Yakar"
 "Jola"
 "Taar Dusey"
 "Manko"
 "Yaye Boye"
 "Plus je fais ci, plus je fais ça"
 "Mbindane"
 "Wakhal"
 "Ouvriers"
 "Jiguen"
 "Ma fille"
 "Tajabone"

Singles
 Rero (1994)

Guest singles
Africa Nossa (2006) (with Cesaria Evora)

Music videos

References

External links
RFI Musique biography
Official page French bio
[ Allmusic link]
Lo discography

1956 births
Living people
21st-century Senegalese male singers
Wrasse Records artists
Senegalese guitarists
Senegalese people of Nigerien descent
Chevaliers of the Légion d'honneur
Chewa
20th-century Senegalese male singers